State Route 296 (SR 296), also known as Taylor Place Road, is an east–west state highway in Fentress County, Tennessee, connecting Jamestown with Allardt.

Route description
SR 296 travels through rural areas for entire length, both farmland and wooded areas. There are no other cities or communities along the route besides at either of its termini.

Major intersections

References

296
Transportation in Fentress County, Tennessee